Book club may refer to:

 Book discussion club, a group of people who meet to discuss a book or books that they have read
 Literature circle, a group of students who meet in a classroom to discuss a book or books that they have read
 Book sales club, a subscription-based method of selling and purchasing books
 Text publication society, also known as a book club, a subscription-based learned society dedicated to the publication and sale of scholarly editions of texts

Book club may also refer to:
 Book Club (film), a 2018 American comedy film
 The Book Club, an Australian television show that discusses books
 Bookclub (radio), a BBC Radio 4 programme
 The Richard & Judy, Book Club, a regular chat show segment responsible for 26% of book sales in the United Kingdom in 2008
 The original name of Siam Commercial Bank, established 1904
 The Book Group, a British television situation comedy

See also 
 Literary Club (disambiguation)